Leessang, Special Jungin is the compilation album by South Korean hip-hop duo Leessang. The album was released on March 5, 2004. The album contains 16 songs.

Track listing

References

2004 greatest hits albums
Korean-language albums
Leessang albums